Zaghloul is a Middle Eastern name, used both as a surname and as a given name.

Notable people with this name as a surname include:
Ali Faik Zaghloul (1924–1995), Egyptian radio presenter
Fayez Zaghloul (born 1959), Syrian boxer
Hatim Zaghloul (born 1957), Egyptian electrical engineer and inventor
Lutfi Zaghloul (born 1938), Palestinian poet
Mohamed Zaghloul (born 1993), Egyptian wrestler
Mona Zaghloul, Egyptian-American electronics engineer
Saad Zaghloul (1859–1927), Egyptian revolutionary and statesman
Safiya Zaghloul (1878–1946), Egyptian political activist

Notable people with this name as a given name include:
Zaghloul El-Naggar (born 1933), Egyptian geologist, Muslim scholar, and author